The economy of Austria is a developed social market economy, with the country being one of the fourteen richest in the world in terms of GDP (gross domestic product) per capita. Until the 1980s, many of Austria's largest industry firms were nationalised. In recent years, privatisation has reduced state holdings to a level comparable to other European economies.

Labour movements are particularly strong in Austria, and they have a large influence on labour politics. Next to a highly developed industry, international tourism is the most important part of the national economy. The economy of Austria's average GDP is 13th growth in OECD countries, from 1992 to 2017. In Austria, 1.37% over average population growth is the strong factor.

Germany has historically been the main trading partner of Austria, making the Austrian economy vulnerable to rapid changes in the German economy. However, since Austria became a member state of the European Union, it has gained closer ties to other European Union economies. This development reduced its economic dependence on Germany. In addition, Austria's membership in the EU has drawn an influx of foreign investors.

They were attracted by Austria's access to the European Single Market and the country's proximity to the aspiring economies of the European Union. Growth in GDP has accelerated in recent years, and reached 3.3% in 2006.

In 2022 Austria has a very high, 52,026$ nominal GDP per capita ranked 15th.

Vienna was ranked the fifth richest NUTS-2 region within Europe (see Economy of the European Union), with its GDP reaching €38,632 per capita. It was trailing behind Inner London, Luxembourg, the Brussels-Capital Region and Hamburg.

Growth had been steady between 2002 and 2006, varying between 1 and 3.3%. After hitting 0% in 2013, growth had picked up a little. As of 2016, growth was set at 1.5%.

History

Foundation and Interbellum 
First Austrian Republic, founded as a result of the dissolution of Austria-Hungary, inherited an economy battered by the ravages of the First World War, namely:

 The abolition of the gold standard in 1914.
 Provision by the central bank of credit to the state, increasing the money supply.
 The balance-of-payments deficit caused by the Austrian need to import food and fuel, devaluing the krone (the Austrian currency at the time).
 The use of deficit spending to finance food subsidies, leading to a 12-fold increase of banknotes in circulation.

A number of international relief schemes failed to garner enough support while a report by Sir William Goode argued that the Austrian economy would collapse without swift foreign intervention. As such, the Austrian economic crisis stretched into its second year, with inflation running at 99%.

League of Nations Bailout 
With annual inflation running at 2,877%, the League of Nations was officially appointed to organise an Austrian reconstruction plan in August 1922. The League scheme was based on the view that Austrian troubles as a result of an inability to pay for necessities and obtain credit, and therefore, an Austrian financial revival was critical to Austrian survival. To this end, the plan was focused solely on financial reconstruction. Austria would receive loans raised from international money markets and the Austrian public, which would be secured on customs and tobacco taxes. In exchange, Austria would in effect lose sovereignty over its economy, agreeing to:

 Relinquish control over the mints to an independent bank, with the aim of returning to the gold standard.
 Terminate the printing of money by the central bank.
 Eliminate the budget deficit (requiring the implementation of austerity measures and monetary control).

The measures took effect in 1923. Short-term effects were impressive; during the announcement to undertake Austrian reconstruction in August 1922, public confidence soared. Foreign currency holdings were converted back into krone, stabilising the currency. This allowed the Austrian Foreign Exchange Agency to finally intervene to fix the krone to the dollar, something that the wild gyrations of the past had not permitted. Capital rushed back into Austria, and domestic prices stabilised, pronouncing the end of hyperinflation.

The steam ran out shortly after implementation. Growth averaged 0.35% per annum until 1929, unemployment leapt five-fold, bankruptcies increased 41-fold, and the trade deficit doubled.

Anschluss 

Austria was annexed by Nazi Germany in 1938, and consequently lost control of its own economic policy until the formation of the Second Republic in 1945.

Post World War II 
Ever since the end of the World War II, Austria has achieved sustained economic growth. In the soaring 1950s, the rebuilding efforts for Austria lead to an average annual growth rate of more than 5% in real terms and averaged about four-point five percent through most of the 1960s. Following moderate real GDP growth of 1.7%, 2% and 1.2%, respectively, in 1995, 1996, and 1997, the economy rebounded and with real GDP expansion of 2.9 percent in 1998 and 2.2% in 1999.

Austria became a member of the EU on 1 January 1995. Membership brought economic benefits and challenges and has drawn an influx of foreign investors attracted by Austria's access to the single European market. Austria also has made progress in generally increasing its international competitiveness. As a member of the economic and monetary union of the European Union (EMU), Austria's economy is closely integrated with other EU member countries, especially with Germany. On 1 January 1999, Austria introduced the new Euro currency for accounting purposes. In January 2002, Euro notes and coins were introduced, replacing those of the Austrian schilling.

Currency

In Austria, Euros appear as 1999, however all Austrian euro coins introduced in 2002 have this year on it; unlike other countries of the Eurozone where mint year is minted in the coin. Eight different designs, one per face value, were selected for the Austrian coins. In 2007, in order to adopt the new common map like the rest of the Eurozone countries, Austria changed the common side of its coins.

Before adopting the Euro in 2002 Austria had maintained use of the Austrian schilling which was first established in December 1924. The Schilling was abolished in the wake of the Anschluss in 1938 and has been reintroduced after the end of the World War II in November 1945.

Austria has one of the richest collection of collectors' coins in the Eurozone, with face value ranging from 10 to 100 euro (although a 100,000 euro coin was exceptionally minted in 2004). These coins are a legacy of an old national practice of minting of silver and gold coins. Unlike normal issues, these coins are not legal tender in all the eurozone. For instance, a €5 Austrian commemorative coin cannot be used in any other country.

Privatisation, state participation and labour movements

Many of the country's largest firms were nationalised in the early post-war period to protect them from Soviet takeover as war reparations. For many years, the government and its state-owned industries conglomerate played a very important role in the Austrian economy. However, starting in the early 1990s, the group was broken apart, state-owned firms started to operate largely as private businesses, and a great number of these firms were wholly or partially privatised. The government still operates some firms, state monopolies, utilities, and services. In the aftermath of the financial crisis of 2007–2008 two banks were nationalised. Since 2019 the Österreichische Industrieholding (ÖBAG) administers the investments of the Republic of Austria in partially or entirely nationalized companies, but came under strong criticism after leaked messages showed how Thomas Schmidt had a say in the appointment of the supervisory board and became sole director. Austria enjoys well-developed industry, banking, transportation, services, and commercial facilities.

Austria has a strong labour movement. The Austrian Trade Union Federation (ÖGB) comprises constituent unions with a total membership of about 1.5 million—more than half the country's wage and salary earners. Since 1945, the ÖGB has pursued a moderate, consensus-oriented wage policy, cooperating with industry, agriculture, and the government on a broad range of social and economic issues in what is known as Austria's "social partnership". The ÖGB has often opposed the Schüssel government's programme for budget consolidation, social reform, and improving the business climate, and indications are rising that Austria's peaceful social climate could become more confrontational.

Agriculture, industry and services

Austrian farms, like those of other west European mountainous countries, are small and fragmented, and production is relatively expensive. Since Austria's becoming a member of the EU in 1995, the Austrian agricultural sector has been undergoing substantial reform under the EU's Common Agricultural Policy (CAP). Although Austrian farmers provide about 80% of domestic food requirements, the agricultural contribution to gross domestic product (GDP) has declined since 1950 to less than 3%.

Although some industries are global competitors, such as several iron and steel works, chemical plants and oil corporations that are large industrial enterprises employing thousands of people, most industrial and commercial enterprises in Austria are relatively small on an international scale.

Most important for Austria is the service sector generating the vast majority of Austria's GDP. Vienna has grown into a finance and consulting metropole and has established itself as the door to the East within the last decades. Viennese law firms and banks are among the leading corporations in business with the new EU member states. Tourism is very important for Austria's economy, accounting for around 10 percent of Austria's GDP. In 2001, Austria was the tenth most visited country in the world with over 18.2 million tourists. Previously, dependency on German guests made this sector of the Austrian economy very dependent on German economy. However recent developments have brought a change, especially since winter ski resorts such as Arlberg or Kitzbühel are now more and more frequented by Eastern Europeans, Russians and Americans.

Austria produced in 2018:

 2.3 million tons of sugar beet (the beet is used to manufacture sugar and ethanol);
 2.1 million tons of maize;
 1.3 million tons of wheat;
 697 thousand tons of potato;
 695 thousand tons of barley;
 387 thousand tons of apple;
 367 thousand tons of grape;
 278 thousand tons of triticale;
 184 thousand tons of soybean;
 177 thousand tons of rye (12th largest world producer);
 132 thousand tons of onion;
 120 thousand tons of rapeseed;
 111 thousand tons of pear;

In addition to smaller productions of other agricultural products.

Health care services 

Austria's health care system was developed alongside other social welfare programmes by the social democrats in Vienna initially.

Trade position

Trade with other EU countries accounts for almost 66% of Austrian imports and exports. Expanding trade and investment in the emerging markets of central and eastern Europe is a major element of Austrian economic activity. Trade with these countries accounts for almost 14% of Austrian imports and exports, and Austrian firms have sizable investments in and continue to move labour-intensive, low-tech production to these countries. Although the big investment boom has waned, Austria still has the potential to attract EU firms seeking convenient access to these developing markets.

Mergers and acquisitions 

Companies and investors from Austria are active in mergers and acquisitions (M&A). Since 1991, more than 7,183 mergers & acquisitions transactions have been announced with a known total value of 261.6 bil. EUR. In 2017, over 245 deals with a total value of over 12.9 bil. EUR have taken place. They are not only active in national deals, but also as important investors in cross-border M&A abroad, with Germany being the most important partner. 854 German companies have been acquired by Austrian parant companies (outbound) so far.

The industry with the largest M&A activity in Austria in terms of transaction value has been the financial sector, whereas the industry with the largest number of transactions has been Industrials - representing 19.2%.

Data 
The following table shows the main economic indicators in 1980–2021 (with IMF staff estimtates in 2022–2027). Inflation under 5% is in green.

See also

List of Austrian states by GDP
List of largest Austrian companies
Austrian Business Agency
 Economy of Europe

References

External links

ATX-INDEX VIENNA (%5EATX)
Article by Nicholas Vardy, Global Investment Expert, on Austria's Economic Growth into 2006
Comprehensive current and historical economic data
World Bank Summary Trade Statistics Austria
Tariffs applied by Austria as provided by ITC's ITC Market Access Map, an online database of customs tariffs and market requirements

 
Austria
Austria
Austria

bn:অস্ট্রিয়া#অর্থনীতি